The triboracyclopropenyl fragment is a cyclic structural motif in boron chemistry, named for its geometric similarity to cyclopropene. In contrast to nonplanar borane clusters that exhibit higher coordination numbers at boron (e.g., through 3-center 2-electron bonds to bridging hydrides or cations), triboracyclopropenyl-type structures are rings of three boron atoms where substituents at each boron are also coplanar to the ring. Triboracyclopropenyl-containing compounds are extreme cases of inorganic aromaticity. They are the lightest and smallest cyclic structures known to display the bonding and magnetic properties that originate from fully delocalized electrons in orbitals of σ and π symmetry. Although three-membered rings of boron are frequently so highly strained as to be experimentally inaccessible, academic interest in their distinctive aromaticity and possible role as intermediates of borane pyrolysis motivated extensive computational studies by theoretical chemists. Beginning in the late 1980s with mass spectrometry work by Anderson et al. on all-boron clusters, experimental studies of triboracyclopropenyls were for decades exclusively limited to gas-phase investigations of the simplest rings (ions of B3). However, more recent work has stabilized the triboracyclopropenyl moiety via coordination to donor ligands or transition metals, dramatically expanding the scope of its chemistry.

Synthesis 

For gas-phase spectroscopic studies, triboracyclopropenyl-containing compounds are obtained via laser ablation of boron targets and collimation of the resulting plasma cloud in a flow of inert carrier gas such as helium. The charged molecules of interest are then mass-selected by time-of-flight mass spectrometry. Addition of gases such as N2 or CO to the gas stream affords the corresponding adducts, while addition of metals such as iridium and vanadium to the B target yields the corresponding metal-doped clusters.

The sole isolable example of a triboracyclopropenyl anion that persists in solution and in the solid state was identified by Braunschweig and coworkers, who synthesized it by reducing the aminoborane Cl2B=NCy2 (Cy = cyclohexyl) with finely dispersed sodium metal in dimethoxyethane (DME). Cooling of the resulting orange-red solution of the dimeric species Na4[B3(NCy2)3]2 • 2 DME resulted in crystals suitable for X-ray diffraction, by which the structure was determined. Although the detailed reduction mechanism is unknown, it has been suggested that subvalent "R2N−B" intermediates are involved in the formation of such boron clusters.

Structure and bonding 
Due to their special status as the simplest aromatic cycles, the electronic structure of triboracyclopropenyl derivatives has been analyzed with a variety of techniques in computational chemistry. These have ranged from canonical molecular orbital theory to alternative formulations of bonding such as adaptive natural density partitioning theory, the quantum theory of atoms in molecules, natural bond orbital theory, natural orbitals for chemical valence and electron localization function analysis. NICS and ring current calculations have also been used to characterize the aromaticity in such systems by using magnetic criteria. In general, the extremely small size of these cycles implies that their bonding electrons experience substantial Coulomb repulsion, resulting in abnormally high ring strain. This effect is partially compensated for by the stabilization offered by aromatic delocalization.

B3+ 

B3+ displays π aromaticity associated with its a2''-symmetric HOMO. In its singlet electronic ground state, it is a Hückel 2π electron system analogous to the cyclopropenium cation, but it is too reactive to be isolated. It is triangular, with D3h symmetry - all of its B atoms and B-B bond distances are chemically equivalent. The gas-phase adducts B3(N2)3+ and B3(CO)3+ have been computationally studied through ETS-NOCV (extended transition state - natural orbitals for chemical valence) theory, which dissects the changes in energy and electron density that result as a molecule is prepared from a reference state of noninteracting fragments. ETS-NOCV energy decomposition analysis suggests that the N2 and CO adducts are primarily stabilized (by -83.6 and -112.3 kcal/mol respectively) through σ donation of the exocyclic ligands into the highly electron-deficient boron ring. As a result, each was interpreted as a B3+ moiety supported by dative bonding from N2 or CO. The electron deformation density constructed from the NOCVs of this system, together with charges derived from natural bond orbital populations, indicate electron flow from the exocyclic ligand into the ring, which induces all the equivalent bonds of the B3+ core to shorten by approximately 4 pm. π-symmetry interactions are observed with both the weak σ donor N2 and the strong π acceptor ligand CO. However, the out-of-plane π backdonation (from the π system of the B3 ring to the π acceptor orbitals of each ligand) is less stabilizing than the in-plane π backdonation, with strengths of -26.7 and -19.6 kcal/mol for the [B3(CO)2+ + CO] system. This suggests that the minimum-energy configuration of the molecule is one which preserves maximal π aromaticity in the B3+ core.

Just as aromatic species like the cyclopentadienyl anion and the cyclopropenium cation can coordinate to transition metals, it was recently demonstrated that the B3+ ring can bind to metal centers. Laser ablation of a mixed B/Ir target produces two isomers of IrB3−, a B3+ ring coordinated to a formal Ir2- anion. These are a pseudo-planar η2 adduct and a tetrahedral η3 adduct, the latter of which contains an aromatic triboracyclopropenyl fragment. Both are nearly identical in energy and coexist in the generated cluster beam.   

Computations suggest that B3+ may even bind inert noble-gas atoms to form an unusual family of compounds B3(Rg)3+ (Rg = rare/noble gas), with nonnegligible bond strengths (from 15 to 30 kcal/mol) that originate from Rg p-orbital σ donicity and a significant degree of charge transfer from Rg to B3+. The possibility of new noble-gas compounds that form exothermally and spontaneously is an opportunity for experimental work.

B3 
B3 possesses a singly occupied a1' HOMO (a SOMO) that consists of σ-symmetric orbitals oriented toward the core of the ring, associated with σ delocalization and slightly shorter B-B bond lengths as compared to B3+. It is paramagnetic with a doublet ground state. It is nonpolar, flat and triangular, having D3h symmetry.

B3− 
B3−, with a filled a1' HOMO in D3h symmetry, is considered to be "doubly" aromatic and relatively stable - it simultaneously possesses highly delocalized σ and π electrons in its HOMO and HOMO-1 respectively.

B3R32- 
B3R32-, formulated with electron-sharing B−R bonds rather than dative arrows, is isoelectronic to B3+. 8 electrons are assigned to the triboracyclopenyl core, 6 in σ bonding orbitals and 2 in the π system, resulting in Hückel aromaticity. The only experimentally characterized compound of this class is Na4[B3(NCy2)3]2 • 2 DME, a dimer of stacked B3R32- units which are themselves aromatic. Natural bond orbital analysis indicates that this compound is highly stabilized (by roughly 45 kcal/mol) by a donor-acceptor interaction of localized B−B bond orbitals with corresponding B−N antibonding orbital across the ring, in addition to being bound together by electrostatic attraction to bridging Na+ cations identified in the crystal structure. DFT calculations show that the HOMO and HOMO-1 are antisymmetric and symmetric combinations of the π HOMO of an individual ring, respectively - a feature shared with metallocenes.

Spectroscopy and spectrometry 
Triboracyclopropenyl-derived compounds were first identified by their mass-to-charge ratio, as transient species in the mass spectrometry of complex mixtures of cationic boron clusters. Reactive scattering studies with O2 soon followed, revealing the relatively strong bonding within light boron clusters. Subsequently, B3 was isolated in matrices of frozen noble gases and electron paramagnetic resonance spectra were recorded which confirmed its D3h geometry. Hyperfine coupling of the unpaired electron to the 11B nucleus provided an estimate of 15% s-orbital character for the a1' HOMO. The small and nonpolar B3 rings were able to tumble and rotate freely even when confined in the matrix.

In general, triboracyclopropenyl-containing species have been too short-lived and produced in insufficient quantity for transmission-mode infrared spectroscopy. However, dissociating B3(N2)3+ with infrared light and observing the decay of the corresponding mass-to-charge signal via mass spectrometry allowed an effective infrared spectrum of B3(N2)3+ to be recorded. This vibrational photodissociation spectrum contained only a single detectable vibration with a redshift of 98 cm−1 relative to gaseous N2, suggesting a highly symmetric B3(N2)3+ adduct with slightly weakened N≡N bonding.

Negatively charged ions containing triboracyclopropenyl have proven amenable to study by photoelectron spectroscopy. By Koopman's theorem, neglecting the effects of strong electron correlation, the kinetic energies of electrons detached by X-rays can be mapped onto binding energies of individual orbitals and reveal the molecular electronic structure. Splitting of the resulting spectral peaks from "vibrational progression" (according to the Franck-Condon principle) indicates how ionization at different energies changes specific vibrational frequencies of the molecule, and such effects on bonding are interpreted in terms of changes to the electron configuration.  In B3−, an unusually high-intensity and high energy band corresponding to a multielectron or "shake-up" transition (coupled electron detachment and electronic excitation) was observed, suggesting the strong electron correlation present in the triboracyclopropenyl fragment. For IrB3−, vibrational progression from the stretching and breathing vibrations of IrB3 could be assigned in the overlaid spectra of both isomers present in the cluster beam. By comparison to computations, the minimum energy structure of IrB3 could then be formulated as a tetrahedron with an intact, aromatic B3+ moiety.

Reactivity 

The reactivity of triboracyclopropenyl-containing compounds is relatively under-explored, as only one example has been prepared in the solution phase. The compound reported by Braunschweig, Na4[B3(NCy2)3]2 • 2 DME, is an extremely potent reductant with an oxidation potential of -2.42 V vs. the ferrocene/ferrocenium couple. As a result, it is capable of reducing chloroboranes to afford tetrahedral B clusters, along with reducing PbCl2 directly to metallic Pb. In addition, it will undergo a ring-opening reaction at the B3 moiety by abstracting chlorine atoms from hexachloroethane. This level of reducing power is roughly comparable to an alkali metal, and has not been previously observed for any molecule based on an organic framework.

Although most examples of transition metal-doped trinuclear boron clusters do not contain an aromatic triboracyclopropenyl fragment, the reactivity of such species with small molecules is likely to attract increasing scientific interest. It has been demonstrated under the conditions of mass spectrometry that VB3+ dehydrogenates methane to afford the products VB3CH2+ and H2. A minor side reaction that produces VH+ and eliminates B3CH3 is also operative.

See also 

 Organoboron chemistry
 Cyclopropenium ion

References 

Boron compounds
Aromatic compounds
Hypothetical chemical compounds